The Best of Arlo Guthrie is a 1977 compilation album by Arlo Guthrie.

Track listing

"Alice's Restaurant Massacree" 18:33 previously on Alice's Restaurant
"Gabriel's Mother's Hiway Ballad #16 Blues" 6:25 previously on Washington County
"Cooper's Lament" 2:46 previously on Last of the Brooklyn Cowboys
"Motorcycle (Significance of the Pickle) Song" 6:28 previously on Alice's Restaurant and Arlo
"Coming into Los Angeles" 3:03 previously on Running Down the Road
"Last Train" 3:03 previously on Last of the Brooklyn Cowboys
"City of New Orleans" (written by Steve Goodman) 4:31 previously on Hobo's Lullaby
"Darkest Hour" 4:04 previously on Amigo
"Last to Leave" 2:35 previously on Arlo Guthrie

Bonus Tracks on the CD Re-release:

"Presidential Rag" 4:27 previously on Arlo Guthrie
"Deportees" (written by Woody Guthrie and Martin Hoffman) 3:49 previously on Arlo Guthrie
"Children of Abraham" 2:23 previously on Arlo Guthrie

Notes 

1977 greatest hits albums
Arlo Guthrie compilation albums
Reprise Records compilation albums